Borivali (station code: BO (suburban)/BVI (mainline)) is a railway station on the Western line of the Mumbai Suburban Railway network and an outbound station. It serves the suburb of Borivali.

The Borivali Railway Station is a terminus for all slow, semi-fast and fast trains on the Mumbai Suburban Railway system. It also serves as the final city-limit stop for all mail and express trains on Western Railway before leaving Mumbai. As of Oct 2022, the plans to extend the Harbour Line to Borivali, and expansion plans are in full steam, with the survey for land acquisition being completed. 

Borivali is used by almost 2.87 lakhs (287,000) passengers every day and is the busiest station on the western suburban line of Mumbai. The number of passengers using Borivali is much higher compared to other stations because many commuters from adjoining stations go there to catch a train as it is impossible to board a local train from stations such as Dahisar, Kandivali or Malad.

Platforms
For the convenience of the passengers Western Railway has decided to change the platform numbers of Borivali station. The platforms have now been numbered from west to east to maintain uniformity. Changes will be effective from 4 June 2017.

As of July 2011, there are 9 platforms at the station and as of 4 June 2017 after renumbering of platform number the trains that these platforms handle are as follows:
 1st - Caters to Churchgate bound trains
 2nd - Caters to Churchgate bound trains
 3rd - Caters to both Churchgate bound and Virar bound Trains
 4th - Caters predominantly to Churchgate bound trains
 5th - Caters to both Churchgate and Virar bound trains
 6th - Caters to Virar bound trains and also long distance Express like Rajdhani express and Mail trains going outside Mumbai
 7th - Caters to Churchgate bound fast trains and also long distance Express and Mail trains coming into Mumbai
 8th - Caters to Churchgate bound trains and also to long distance Express and Mail trains coming into and going outside Mumbai
 9th -  Caters to Churchgate bound trains and also to long distance Express and Mail trains coming into and going outside Mumbai

The 1st and 2nd platforms are terminal platforms.

History
Borivali is mentioned as one of the stations where the first regular suburban train service of BB&CI halted. Then, it was known as 'Berewla'. This train service was inaugurated on April 12, 1867. The Station was remodeled in 1913.

Gallery

References

External links
 
 
 An WR article about the early BB&CI suburban railway, with images and diagrams of Borivali station (pg 5 and 11)

Borivali
Railway stations in Mumbai Suburban district
Mumbai Suburban Railway stations
Mumbai WR railway division